Miltiadis "Miltos" Tentoglou (born 18 March 1998) is a Greek long jumper. He won the gold medal at the 2020 Tokyo Olympics. In 2022, Tentoglou became the World Indoor champion jumping the current Greek indoor record of 8.55 metres, which places him sixth on the respective world all-time list, and took silver at the outdoor World Championships. He is a five-time European champion, winning two consecutive outdoor titles in 2018 and 2022 and a record three consecutive men's indoor titles between 2019 and 2023.

He was the 2016 World Under-20 Championships silver medallist, and 2017 European U20 and 2019 European U23 champion. Tentoglou was the 2022 Diamond League long jump champion.

Career
Miltiadis Tentoglou has won five consecutive European titles: at the 2018 European Championships in Berlin, where he became the youngest Greek man to win a continental gold, the 2019 European Indoor Championships in Glasgow, the 2021 European Indoor Championships in Toruń, the 2022 European Championships in Munich, where he set a championship record in the process, and the 2023 European Indoor Championships in Istanbul, where he became the first man in history to secure three consecutive long jump titles at a European Indoors.

Achievements

International competitions

Circuit wins and titles
 Diamond League long jump champion:  2022
 2021: Monaco Herculis
 2022: Rabat Meeting International Mohammed VI d'Athlétisme, Oslo Bislett Games, Stockholm BAUHAUS-galan, Chorzów Kamila Skolimowska Memorial, Zürich Weltklasse

National titles
 Greek Athletics Championships: 2017 (8.30 m ), 2018, 2019, 2021, 2022
 Greek Indoor Athletics Championships: 2019, 2020, 2021, 2022, 2023

References

External links

Official Tentoglou Family Website

Living people
1998 births
Greek male long jumpers
Olympic athletes of Greece
Athletes (track and field) at the 2016 Summer Olympics
Sportspeople from Grevena
Greek European Athletics champions (track and field)
European Athletics Indoor Championships winners
Athletes (track and field) at the 2020 Summer Olympics
Medalists at the 2020 Summer Olympics
Olympic gold medalists in athletics (track and field)
Olympic gold medalists for Greece
World Athletics Indoor Championships winners